420th may refer to:

420th Air Base Group or RAF Fairford (IATA: FFD, ICAO: EGVA), Royal Air Force (RAF) station in Gloucestershire, England
420th Air Refueling Squadron, inactive United States Air Force unit
420th Bombardment Squadron, inactive United States Air Force unit
420th Engineer Brigade (United States), combat engineer brigade of the United States Army based in Bryan, Texas
420th Flight Test Flight, United States Air Force Reserve squadron based at Phoenix-Mesa Gateway Airport Arizona

See also
420 (number)
420 (disambiguation)
AD 420, the year 420 (CDXX) of the Julian calendar
420 BC